Caldwell Edwards (January 8, 1841 – July 23, 1922) was a U.S. Representative from Montana.

Born in Sag Harbor, New York, Edwards was educated in the district schools.  He worked as a salesman and bookkeeper in dry-goods stores for several years.  He moved to Bozeman, Montana, in 1864 and became engaged in agricultural pursuits.  He served as member of the Montana House of Representatives from 1901 to 1905.

Edwards was elected as a Populist to the Fifty-seventh Congress (March 4, 1901 - March 3, 1903).  He was not a candidate for renomination in 1902. At the expiration of his term Edwards returned to his ranch.  He later returned to Sag Harbor, where he lived in retirement.  He died at his Sag Harbor home on July 23, 1922 after suffering a stroke.  Edwards was interred in Oakland Cemetery.

References

1841 births
1922 deaths
People from Sag Harbor, New York
People's Party members of the United States House of Representatives from Montana
Members of the Montana House of Representatives
Politicians from Bozeman, Montana